Julius Bär Group AG, known alternatively as Julius Baer Group Ltd., is a private banking corporation founded and based in Switzerland. Headquartered in Zürich, it is among the older Swiss banking institutions. In terms of assets under management, Julius Baer is number three among Swiss banks  after the two generalists UBS and Credit Suisse and the biggest pure-play private bank. 

Established as a traditional private bank and named after Swiss banker Julius Bär, it provides investment management, real estate financing, wealth management, and select offerings in sales and trading based on an open and managed architecture. The majority of income is generated by commissions and service fees. Located in 28 countries, it is known for its banking secrecy and client confidentiality. Julius Baer employs a staff of over 6,600 worldwide.

The group manages assets for private clients from all over the world.  The firm's services consist mainly of wealth management and investment consultancy. The bank provides products via its open architecture platform as well as securities and foreign exchange trading. The shares of the Julius Baer Group are listed on the SIX Swiss Exchange and form part of the SMI MID, the mid-cap stock index comprising the 30 largest and most liquid listed Swiss companies not in the SMI.

History 

Julius Bär Group Ltd. is a Swiss private banking group which is the parent company of Bank Julius Baer, a traditional private bank based in Zurich, Switzerland. The firm dates itself back to 1890   when an exchange office was founded by Ludwig Hirschhorn and Theodor Grob. Grob left the firm again in 1896 when at the same time Joseph Michael Uhl and Julius Bär joined. In 1901, Julius Bär acquired the bank and remained as partner until 1922.  Hans E. Mayenfisch joined the bank on 1 July 1913 as partner and was active until 1947.  The sons of Julius Bär became partners as follows: Walter Bär on 1 October 1913 until 1947, Werner Bär in 1921 until his death on 2 February 1960 and Richard Bär, who was a physicist became a silent partner in 1922. After his death in 1940 he was succeeded by his widow Ellen Bär. 

The members of the 3rd generation became active in the bank with Hans Bär on 21 August 1947 until 1996, last as chairman of the board of Julius Baer Holding Ltd, Nicolas Bär on 22 September 1951 until March 1993, last as Chairman of Bank Julius Baer & Co.Ltd, Peter Bär on 1 November 1955 until his death on 11 November 1998 last as member of the board of Julius Baer Holding Ltd., and Rudolf Bär 1969 until 2005, last as member of the board of Julius Baer Holding Ltd. Hans Bär was succeeded as Chairman by Thomas Bär 1996 until 2003. On 4 July 1970 Dr. Ernst Bieri, former head of the finance department of the City of Zurich joined as outside partner until 1990 as member of the board of Julius Baer Holding Ltd.

Since 1980, the Bank began accepting non-family investors until it became a listed public company in 2005. In September 2005, the bank acquired the formerly independent private bankers Ferrier, Lullin & Cie SA, Ehinger & Armand von Ernst AG, Banco di Lugano and the asset management house GAM (Global Asset Management) from UBS, making it one of the largest independent asset managers in Switzerland. In 2012, the bank acquired Merrill Lynch's wealth management business outside the US from Bank of America. The 4th generation was involved with the leadership of the bank with Raymond Bär from 1988 until 2012, last as Chairman of the board of Julius Baer Holding Ltd. Michael Bär joined the bank in 1992 and was active in various senior operating functions, last as a member of the group executive committee until 2005.  As representatives of the family shareholders Mark Bär (1999–2005), Andreas Bär  (2003–2005) and Beatrice Speiser-Bär  (2003–2009) were members of the board of Julius Baer Holding Ltd. Since its inception in 2014, the bank has been title sponsor of the FIA Formula E championship. The number of personnel by full-time equivalent grew from around 400 in 1980 to more than 2'000 in the year 2000 and further to more than 6'000 in 2020 when nearly half of them were employed in Julius Baer offices abroad.

Capital and scale 
Julius Baer originally operated as a partnership and was incorporated on 27 November 1974 with a share capital of CHF 14.040 million, divided into 56,400 registered shares of CHF 100 each and 16,800 bearer shares of CHF 500 each. The company went public in 1980. The Baer Families relinquished control in 2005 converting the share capital into a single class of registered shares all quoted at the SIX Swiss Exchange. Today, MFS Investment Management is the single biggest shareholder with nearly 10% of voting rights.

In 2020, Julius Baer announced it plans to slash 300 jobs, a decision which is a part of the company's CEO's three-year plan to improve the bank's profit margins.

Acquisitions 
In September 2005, Julius Bär acquired the independent private banks Ferrier Lullin, Ehinger & Armand von Ernst, Banco di Lugano, and the asset management house Global Asset Management (GAM) from the Swiss banking giant UBS AG, to become one of the largest independent wealth management firms in Switzerland. UBS acquired almost 21% of Baer's shares as part of the deal,  but sold off its stake in May 2007 to fund a share buyback. GAM was demerged as a separate company in October 2009. The companies of the group are consolidated within Julius Bär Gruppe AG, whose shares are listed on the SIX Swiss Exchange.

In November 2012, Julius Baer and Milan-based Kairos Investment Management SpA (‘Kairos’) announced that they had reached an agreement for a cooperation to jointly create a leading onshore wealth management player in Italy. Julius Baer’s Italian SIM was integrated into Kairos and, simultaneously, Julius Baer acquired 19.9% of Kairos. All Italian wealth management activities of the two groups run under the name Kairos Julius Baer.

Julius Baer acquired Merrill Lynch’s International Wealth Management business (IWM), based outside the US, in August 2012, for 860 million Swiss francs ($884.8 million). The deal grew Julius Baer's assets under management by 40%, raising the AuM to 251 billion francs ($258.2 billion).

In July 2014, Julius Baer announced that it had purchased the private banking assets of Israeli Bank Leumi.

Corporate social responsibility

Julius Baer Foundation
The main focus of the Julius Baer Foundation is youth, vocational training, recycling and wealth inequality. Projects that directly benefit the younger generation are sponsored in various ways. Set up in 1965 by Walter J. Baer initially for charitable causes in Switzerland, the scope has grown together with the expansion of the business to a global scale. Julius Baer Foundation works together with and supports among others Sistema B (Chile), Solafrica (Ethiopia), Swisscontact (Switzerland) and Plastic Free Planet (UK). It continues its traditional support of the Julius Baer employee-based JB Cares organisation and selected art museums in Switzerland.

In 2020, JB Cares and the JB Foundation supported aid programmes in Lebanon following the accident in the port of Beirut on 4 August 2020.

Since 2019, Romeo Lacher has been the president and chairman of the Julius Baer Foundation. Andreas Weinberg serves as vice president.

Controversies and lawsuits
In February 2008, Julius Baer Group sent cease and desist letters to Wikileaks and its domain registrar, resulting in subsequent legal action. The bank initially obtained a permanent injunction against the Wikileaks domain registrar on 18 February. On 29 February, a federal judge dissolved the initial injunction, citing First Amendment concerns. On 5 March 2008, the bank 
dropped the case.

Alex Widmer, the chief executive of Bank Julius Baer, killed himself on 4 December 2008. Hans de Gier, the former chief of Julius Baer Group, assumed Widmer's responsibilities for the interim.

In May 2009, Boris F. J. Collardi assumed the role as CEO for the Julius Baer Group Ltd. and Bank Julius Baer & Co. Ltd.

On 17 January 2011, Rudolf Elmer provided Wikileaks with the alleged bank account details of 2,000 individuals and corporations from three financial institutions, including Julius Baer. Elmer, a previous employee of Julius Baer, worked for the bank from the early 1980s until 2002 when he was dismissed for data theft. In 2008, Elmer had previously leaked bank information to Wikileaks, according to the German magazine Der Spiegel, which had referred to his documents as ‘partly authentic and partly fake'. It was subsequently reported that the discs had been empty, and the event a ploy to draw attention to Elmer’s court proceedings in Switzerland.

In 2011, Julius Baer became one of a dozen Swiss banks to come under U.S. federal investigation for allegedly aiding US citizens in committing tax evasion. The bank subsequently chose to engage with federal investigators, cooperating with the US Department of Justice investigation and accepting responsibility for its conduct. On 4 February 2016, the bank signed a deferred prosecution agreement with the DOJ and agreed to pay a fine of $547 million. Acting Chief Executive Bernhard Hodler reacted to the agreement in a statement saying that "This important step confirms Julius Baer's approach to cooperating constructively with competent authorities and our commitment to fulfill our regulatory obligations and responsibilities."

On 20 February 2020 the Swiss Financial Market Supervisory Authority (FINMA) censured Julius Baer for falling "significantly short" in combating money laundering between 2009 and 2018 with regards to corruption allegations involving FIFA and PDVSA, Venezuela's state-owned oil and gas company. FINMA ordered Julius Baer to change its remuneration and recruitment policies, and appointed an auditor to oversee the bank to ensure its compliance with anti-money laundering standards. In March 2021, FINMA lifted the ban on large acquisitions for Julius Baer. The move was driven by a report by an independent auditor that supervised the implementation of the measures that FINMA ordered. Julius Baer said it welcomed the move and noted the "significant progress the bank has made in strengthening its company-wide risk management."

In 2015, Julius Baer began cooperating with the US Department of Justice concerning its investigation of alleged money laundering and corruption involving officials and affiliates of the world soccer federation, FIFA. Julius Baer subsequently entered into a three-year deferred prosecution agreement with the DOJ & agreed to pay fines totaling over $79 million. On May 27, 2021, Julius Baer finalized the agreement with the DOJ, resolving the investigation of the Bank’s role.

See also

 Banking in Switzerland
 List of banks in Switzerland

Notes

References

External links

WikiLeaks Category:Grand Cayman

Banks based in Zürich
Financial services companies of Switzerland
Banks established in 1890
Swiss companies established in 1890
Private banks
Companies listed on the SIX Swiss Exchange
Swiss brands